Richard Henry Coleman (3 April 1888 – 17 February 1965) was a cathedral organist, who served at Peterborough Cathedral.

Background
Richard Henry Pinwill Coleman was born on 3 April 1888 in Dartmouth. He was a chorister in St George's Church, Ramsgate before going to Denstone College.

He studied organ under Sydney Nicholson at Carlisle Cathedral and Manchester Cathedral.

Career
Assistant Organist of:
Manchester Cathedral 1908–1912

Organist of:
St. Mary the Virgin, Blackburn 1912–1914
St Columb's Cathedral 1914–1920
Peterborough Cathedral 1921–1944
Hatfield Parish Church 1947–1948
All Saints' Church, Eastbourne 1949–1959
Chapel Royal, Brighton

References

English classical organists
British male organists
Cathedral organists
People educated at Denstone College
1888 births
1965 deaths
20th-century organists
20th-century British male musicians
20th-century classical musicians
Male classical organists